Teriyaki (Kanji: 照り焼き) is a cooking technique in which foods are broiled or grilled with a glaze of soy sauce, mirin, and sugar. Although commonly associated with Japanese cuisine, this cooking technique is also commonly used in other Asian cuisines such as Chinese cuisine, Indonesian cuisine and Thai cuisine.

Fish – yellowtail, marlin, skipjack tuna, salmon, trout, and mackerel – is mainly used in Japan, while white and red meat – chicken, pork, lamb, and beef – is more often used in the West. Other ingredients sometimes used in Japan include squid, hamburger steak, and meatballs.

Traditionally the meat is dipped in or brushed with sauce several times during cooking. It is believed that Teriyaki in Japan evolved during the 1600s.

The  is traditionally made by mixing and heating soy sauce, sake (or mirin), and sugar (or honey). The sauce is boiled and reduced to the desired thickness, then used to marinate meat, which is then grilled or broiled. Sometimes ginger is added and the final dish may be garnished with spring onions. (see tare).

Variations

A  is a variety of hamburger either topped with teriyaki sauce or with the sauce worked into the ground meat patty. Teriyaki stir-fry refers to stir frying meat or vegetables in teriyaki sauce.
Another variety is teriyaki-style prepared vegetarian products.

By country

United States

Teriyaki sauce 

In North America, any dish made with a teriyaki-like sauce is described using the word teriyaki. This often even includes those using foreign alternatives to sake or mirin, such as wine, or with added ingredients, such as sesame or garlic (uncommon in traditional Japanese cuisine). The sauce used for teriyaki is generally sweet, although it can also be spicy. Pineapple juice is sometimes used, as it not only provides sweetness but also bromelain enzymes that help tenderize the meat. Grilling meat first and pouring the sauce on afterwards or using sweet sauce as a marinade are other non-traditional methods of cooking teriyaki. Teriyaki sauce is sometimes put on chicken wings or used as a dipping sauce.

In the city of Seattle, Washington, a large teriyaki culture emerged in the 1990s. , there were over 83 restaurants in the city with "teriyaki" in their name. It has been described as the city's signature cuisine by some outlets, noting its widespread adoption as a form of fast food.

The first standalone teriyaki restaurant, Toshi's Teriyaki, opened in the Lower Queen Anne neighborhood of Seattle in 1976. The restaurant's low-cost chicken and beef skewers in teriyaki sauce inspired other restaurants in the area. Toshi's later expanded into a chain with 17 locations in the Seattle area by 1996.

See also 
 Asado
 List of cooking techniques

References 

Asian cuisine
Japanese cuisine
Cooking techniques
Hawaiian cuisine
Marinades